Cochlear Bone Anchored Solutions is a company based in Gothenburg, Sweden, that manufactures and distributes bone conduction hearing solutions under the trademark Baha. The company was founded in 1999 under the name Entific Medical Systems. When Cochlear bought the company in 2005, the name was changed to Cochlear Bone Anchored Solutions. The acronym "BAHA" (for bone anchored hearing aid) was trademarked into Baha, as it is not considered a hearing aid by insurance companies.

Baha system
The Baha system is a bone conduction hearing system designed, developed and marketed by Cochlear Bone Anchored Solutions.

It is a semi-implantable, under the skin bone conduction hearing device coupled to the skull by a titanium fixture. The system transfers sound to the inner ear through the bone, thereby bypassing problems in the outer or middle ear. Candidates with a conductive, mixed, or single-sided sensorineural hearing loss can therefore benefit from bone conduction hearing solutions.

Over 100,000 people have had the system implanted.

History

Professor Per-Ingvar Brånemark discovered osseointegration in the 1950s, which allows titanium implants to fuse with human bone. The discovery led to wide use in dental implants. In the mid-1970s Brånemark, together with his ENT colleague Dr Anders Tjellström, glued an Oticon bone vibrator to a snap coupling fitted to a dental implant and then connected it to an audiometer. The patient reported a very high, clear sound. suggesting that the sound propagated l through the bones of the maxilla to the inner ear. This became the starting point for the future development of the hearing device Baha together with the titanium implant.

Doctors Anders Tjellström at Sahlgrenska University Hospital in Gothenburg, Sweden, implanted and fitted the first patient with a Baha sound processor in 1977.

References

External links
 Cochlear Ltd.

Hearing aid manufacturers
Medical technology companies of Sweden
Companies based in Västra Götaland County